Américo Montanarini (11 August 1917 – 14 July 1994) was a Brazilian basketball player. He competed in the men's tournament at the 1936 Summer Olympics.

References

1917 births
1994 deaths
Brazilian men's basketball players
Olympic basketball players of Brazil
Basketball players at the 1936 Summer Olympics
Basketball players from São Paulo